The women's 50 metre freestyle event at the 2000 Summer Olympics took place on 22–23 September at the Sydney International Aquatic Centre in Sydney, Australia.

Dutch rising star Inge de Bruijn added a third gold to her medal tally in swimming at these Games. She powered past the field to touch the wall first in 24.32, the second-fastest of all-time. Earlier in the semifinals, she blasted her own world record of 24.13 to snatch a top seed for the final. Sweden's Therese Alshammar captured the silver in 24.51, while U.S. legend Dara Torres powered home with the bronze in a new American record of 24.63, edging out defending Olympic champion Amy Van Dyken (25.04) by 41-hundredths of a second. The podium placements also replicated the results of the 100 m freestyle (with the exception of Jenny Thompson), held on the sixth night of the Games.

Slovakia's Martina Moravcová finished off the podium in fifth place at 25.24, and was followed in the sixth spot by Germany's Sandra Völker in 25.27. Great Britain's Alison Sheppard (25.45) and Japan's Sumika Minamoto (25.65) closed out the field.

Notable swimmers missed out the top 8 final, featuring Australia's overwhelming favorite Susie O'Neill; Völker's teammate Katrin Meissner, who shared bronze medals with Jill Sterkel in the event's inception in 1988 as a member of the former East German squad; and Estonia's Jana Kolukanova, who grabbed the final spot from the prelims after winning a three-person swimoff.

One of the most popular highlights in the event took place in the first heat. Dubbed as the Crawler, Paula Barila Bolopa had finally completed a unique double for Equatorial Guinea, as she swam the slowest ever race by a female in Olympic history with a time of 1:03.97.

Records
Prior to this competition, the existing world and Olympic records were as follows.

The following new world and Olympic records were set during this competition.

Results

Heats

Swimoff

Semifinals

Semifinal 1

Semifinal 2

Final

References

External links
Official Olympic Report

F
2000 in women's swimming
Women's events at the 2000 Summer Olympics